Dean E. Fischer (October 27, 1936 – July 13, 2000) was an American journalist with Time who served as Assistant Secretary of State for Public Affairs from 1981 to 1982.

Biography

Dean E. Fisher was educated at Monmouth College, graduating with a B.A. in 1958.  During his time in college, he played college football for the Monmouth Fighting Scots as a halfback. He was inducted into the Fighting Scots Hall of Fame in 1988. After graduating from Monmouth College in 1958, Fischer spent a year studying at the University of Calcutta, and then attended graduate school at the University of Chicago, receiving an M.A. in 1960.

In 1960, Fischer became a reporter for The Des Moines Register. He worked there until 1964 when he became a correspondent for Time magazine. He would go on to hold several positions at Time from 1964 to 1999, including becoming news editor of its Washington, D.C. bureau.

President Ronald Reagan nominated him to be Assistant Secretary of State for Public Affairs. Fischer held this office from August 7, 1981, until August 19, 1982.

After his time at the State Department, Fischer returned to Time.

Survivors include his wife Marina Fischer, two daughters Tara and Tasmin, two step children Lara and Karim.

References

American magazine journalists
United States Assistant Secretaries of State
Time (magazine) people
Monmouth College alumni
University of Calcutta alumni
University of Chicago alumni
1936 births
2000 deaths
United States Department of State spokespeople